Safiye Sultan may refer to:

 Safiye Sultan (mother of Mehmed III) (1550–1619), Ottoman imperial consort of Sultan Murad III, and mother and Valide Sultan of Sultan Mehmed III
 Safiye Hanımsultan (daughter of Ismihan Sultan) (1563 - ?), daughter of Ismihan Sultan
 Safiye Hanımsultan (1581–?), Ottoman princess, daughter of Ayşe Hümaşah Sultan
 Safiye Hanımsultan (1630-1682), Ottoman princess, daughter of Gevherhan Sultan
 Safiye Sultan (daughter of Murad IV) (after 1634–1680 or after), Ottoman princess, daughter of Sultan Murad IV
 Safiye Sultan, Ottoman princess (1640–?), daughter of Sultan Ibrahim
 Safiye Sultan (daughter of Mustafa II) (1696–1778), Ottoman princess, daughter of Sultan Mustafa II
 Safiye Sultan (1887–?), Ottoman princess, daughter of Şehzade Mehmed Selaheddin